Sathyavan Savithri is a 2007 Kannada comedy film directed by Ramesh Aravind and produced by Ajay Chandani for Ajay Films banner. The story written by Rajendra Karanth, is inspired by a famous French play Fleur de cactus by Pierre Barillet and Jean-Pierre Gredy which was also made in English as Cactus Flower (1969) and Hindi as Maine Pyaar Kyun Kiya? (2005).

The film features Ramesh Aravind, Jennifer Kotwal and Daisy Bopanna in leading roles. It features soundtrack and score by Gurukiran.

Cast 
 Ramesh Aravind as Sathyavan
 Jennifer Kotwal as Monisha
 Daisy Bopanna as Subbulakshmi
 Nethra
 Mohan Shankar
 Aniruddh
 Komal Kumar
 H. G. Dattatreya
 Sadashiva Brahmavar
 Sundar Raj
 Shobha Raghavendra
 Pal Chandani

Plot
The film is all about the hilarious incidents that happen in a dentist Sathyavan's (Ramesh Aravind) life who is a big time flirt and never believes in marriage. His grandfather (Dattatreya) plays a game of handing over his luxurious property to a charitable trust if he does not heed to the request of marriage. Sathyavan meets a girl Monisha (Jennifer Kotwal) and tries to woo her for marriage. Meanwhile, another girl Subbulakshmi (Daisy Bopanna) comes into his life as his secretary and the proceedings lies on whom Sathyavan chooses to marry.

Soundtrack 
The music was composed by Gurukiran for Anand Audio company. The audio was launched and released to the market on 13 June 2007. The song "Dr. Sathya" is heavily inspired from Barbie Girl song performed by Danish-based dance group Aqua.

Review
Upon release, the film met with favorable critical reviews for its comical content and character portrayals. Rediff.com reviewed with 3.5 stars saying the film is hilarious and is an enjoyable fare for family audiences. Deccan Herald reviewed saying the film is a clean entertainer.

See also
 Cactus Flower (film)
 Maine Pyar Kyun Kiya?

References

External links 

2007 films
2000s Kannada-language films
Indian comedy films
Indian remakes of American films
Indian films based on plays
Films scored by Gurukiran
2007 comedy films
Films directed by Ramesh Aravind